Anekäbrud is an island belonging to the country of Estonia. Anekäbrud is referenced in a book titled Islands of Estonia.

See also
List of islands of Estonia

Islands of Estonia
Saaremaa Parish